Daniel Auguste Constantin (born 8 September 1940 in Thonon-les-Bains, Haute-Savoie, France), is a French colonial administrator.

He was the préfet of Réunion from 1989 until 1991 and the high commissioner of New Caledonia from 31 July 2002 until September 2005.

References

1940 births
Living people
New Caledonia politicians
École nationale d'administration alumni
High Commissioners of New Caledonia
Prefects of Réunion